Manchester Meadows Soccer Complex is a multi field soccer complex containing two stadiums located in Rock Hill, South Carolina.

About
The facility encompasses 70 acres of land and contains two synthetic soccer fields with stadium seating, six natural soccer fields, walking trails, a playground, and several pavilions. Manchester Meadows was completed in 2006 and is currently the home of FC Carolina Discoveries, a soccer team in the National Premier Soccer League, and Charlotte Independence II.

References

Buildings and structures in Rock Hill, South Carolina
Soccer venues in South Carolina
National Premier Soccer League stadiums
2006 establishments in South Carolina
Sports venues completed in 2006
Sports complexes in the United States